The Return of the Rangers is a 1943 American Western film written and directed by Elmer Clifton. The film stars Dave O'Brien, James Newill, Guy Wilkerson, Nell O'Day, Glenn Strange and Emmett Lynn. The film was released on October 26, 1943, by Producers Releasing Corporation.

Plot

Cast          
Dave O'Brien as Tex Wyatt 
James Newill as Jim Steele 
Guy Wilkerson as Panhandle Perkins
Nell O'Day as Anne Miller
Glenn Strange as Frank Martin
Emmett Lynn as Sheriff Summers 
I. Stanford Jolley as Don Bolton
Robert Barron as Dr. Robert Vanner
Henry Hall as Judge Ezra Dean
Harry Harvey Sr. as Philip Dobbs

See also
The Texas Rangers series:
 The Rangers Take Over (1942)
 Bad Men of Thunder Gap (1943)
 West of Texas (1943)
 Border Buckaroos (1943)
 Fighting Valley (1943)
 Trail of Terror (1943)
 The Return of the Rangers (1943)
 Boss of Rawhide (1943)
 Outlaw Roundup (1944)
 Guns of the Law (1944)
 The Pinto Bandit (1944)
 Spook Town (1944)
 Brand of the Devil (1944)
 Gunsmoke Mesa (1944)
 Gangsters of the Frontier (1944)
 Dead or Alive (1944)
 The Whispering Skull (1944)
 Marked for Murder (1945)
 Enemy of the Law (1945)
 Three in the Saddle (1945)
 Frontier Fugitives (1945)
 Flaming Bullets (1945)

References

External links
 

1943 films
1940s English-language films
American Western (genre) films
1943 Western (genre) films
Producers Releasing Corporation films
Films directed by Elmer Clifton
American black-and-white films
1940s American films